The Richard Imison Award is an award which recognises the best radio drama, generally by a writer new to the industry, and is now awarded as part of the BBC Audio Drama Awards. It was established in 1994 and commemorates the life and work of Richard Imison.

Richard Imison was Script Editor for BBC Radio Drama from 1963 to 1991. In the thirty years that Imison worked for BBC Radio Drama it was the largest patron of original creative dramatic writing in Britain. In his role as Script Editor no other single individual therefore had as much influence in either the discovery of new talent or the encouragement of established writers such as Edward Albee, Ludmilla Petrushevskaya, Alexander Gelman, Harold Pinter and Samuel Beckett in the production of Drama for this genre.

After his death in 1993 the Society of Authors established the Imison Award in recognition of Imison's enduring influence on the development of high quality dramatic writing.

Submissions for the award must consist of a completed nomination form as well as three copies of the writer's original script and recording of the broadcast. Further copies may be requested if the work is short-listed.  Further details can be found on the Society of Authors website.

List of prize winners
The prize winners

 2022: The Lemonade Lads by Faebian Averies
 2021: Maynard by Fraser Ayres
 2020: Bathwater by Vicky Foster
 2019: Of A Lifetime, Lulu Raczka
2018: The Book of Yehudit, Adam Usden
2017: Comment Is Free, James Fritz
2016: 30 Eggs, Eoin O'Connor
2015: How to Say Goodbye Properly, E.V. Crowe
2014: The Loving Ballad of Captain Bateman, Joseph Wilde with composer Tim Van Eyken
 2013: Do You Like Banana, Comrade?, Csaba Székely
 2012: Amazing Grace, Michelle Lipton
 2010: The Road Wife, Eoin McNamee
 2009: Girl from Mars, Lucy Caldwell
 2008: The Magician's Daughter, Adam Beeson
 2007: Not Talking, Mike Bartlett
 2006: Mixed Blood, Nazrin Choudhury
 2005: Mr. Sex, Steve Coombs
 2004: All You on the Good Earth, Stephen Sharkey
 2003: Milk; Celia Bryce for The Skategrinder, N.Leyshon and S. McAnena
 2002: The Waltzer, Rhiannon Tise
 2001: Electricity, Murray Gold
 2000: A Matter of Interpretation, Peter Morgan
 1999: Skin Deep, Ben Cooper
 1998: Earthquake Girl, Katie Hims
 1997: Holy Secrets & Wilde Belles, John Waters joint winner Rosemary Kay Holy Secrets & Wilde Belles
 1996: I Luv You Jimmy Spud, Lee Hall
 1995: Daisy the Cow who Talked & Kissing the Gargoyle, Gerry Stembridge joint winner James Stock
 1994: The Long Hot Summer of '76, Gabriel Gbadamosi

References

External links
Society of Authors

Dramatist and playwright awards
Radio drama awards
Society of Authors awards
Awards established in 1994
1994 establishments in the United Kingdom
British radio awards